Battle of Rimini may refer to:

 Battle of Rimini (432), fought between competing factions in the Western Roman Empire
 Battle of Rimini (1944), sometimes used as a synonym of the larger Operation Olive, an offensive by 15th Army Group in Italy